Stephen Michael Gionta (born October 9, 1983) is an American former professional ice hockey centre. He played in the National Hockey League (NHL) with the New Jersey Devils and New York Islanders. Gionta is the younger brother of Brian Gionta, who played for the Devils from 2001 to 2009.

Playing career
As a youth, Gionta played in the 1997 Quebec International Pee-Wee Hockey Tournament with a minor ice hockey team from Rochester, New York.

Gionta was not drafted by any team. However, after graduating from Boston College he signed an amateur tryout agreement with the Albany River Rats. The River Rats were the American Hockey League (AHL) affiliate of the New Jersey Devils, the team in which his older brother Brian was a member of. Gionta made his professional debut at the end of the 2005-06 season with the River Rats. Gionta's first ever AHL game was on April 13, 2006 against the Springfield Falcons. Gionta led his team to a 5–3 victory by scoring 3 goals and adding 1 assist. He was named the first star of the game.

After spending the next few seasons in the minor leagues, Gionta was called up by the Devils during the 2010-11 season. He made his debut on November 5, 2010 in a 3–0 loss to the New York Rangers. Gionta went scoreless in 12 games for the Devils that season.

On April 12, 2012, Gionta scored his first career NHL goal. The goal, which was the game-winning goal, was scored against Craig Anderson of the Ottawa Senators. The Devils won the game 4–2, while Gionta received first star honors of the game. During the 2012 postseason, Gionta skated in 24 games with the Devils, recording three goals and four assists. The Devils advanced to the 2012 Stanley Cup Finals, but fell to the Los Angeles Kings.

On June 29, 2012, Gionta re-signed with the New Jersey Devils on a two-year contract. On July 1, 2014, Gionta re-signed for another two years.

After 11 seasons with the Devils, Gionta's association with the club ended as he was out of contract to become a free agent. Unsigned over the following summer, Gionta accepted a professional try-out contract to attend the New York Islanders' training camp on September 12, 2016. At the end of training camp, he signed a one-year deal with the Islanders' AHL affiliate, the Bridgeport Sound Tigers. On December 21, 2016, Gionta agreed to a one-year, two-way deal with the Islanders. On August 8, 2017, Gionta re-signed with the Islanders to another one-year deal. On October 2, 2017, Gionta was placed on waivers so he can be assigned to the AHL affiliate Bridgeport Sound Tigers.

On October 13, 2018, Gionta returned to the Islanders, signing a one-year, two-way contract. He featured in five games with the Islanders, going scoreless before he was assigned to play out the remainder of his contract in a return to the Bridgeport Sound Tigers.

On August 1, 2019, Gionta announced his retirement from professional hockey after a 13-year playing career, accepting work as a professional scout for the Tampa Bay Lightning.

Career statistics

Regular season and playoffs

International

References

External links
 

1983 births
Living people
Albany Devils players
Albany River Rats players
American men's ice hockey left wingers
American people of Italian descent
Boston College Eagles men's ice hockey players
Bridgeport Sound Tigers players
Ice hockey players from New York (state)
Sportspeople from Rochester, New York
Lowell Devils players
New Jersey Devils players
New York Islanders players
Undrafted National Hockey League players
USA Hockey National Team Development Program players